The George J. Mitchell Scholarship is a fellowship awarded annually by the U.S.-Ireland Alliance funding graduate study in Ireland. The first class of scholars began their studies in 2000. The scholarship is sometimes compared to or grouped with other international fellowships for American students such as the Rhodes Scholarship and Marshall Scholarship. Each year, approximately 300 young Americans apply for the 12 scholarships. In 2020, the US-Ireland Alliance announced that applications for the George J. Mitchell Scholar Class of 2022 increased by 22%, resulting in a record 453 individual applicants for the program.

Background
The George J. Mitchell Scholarship is organized under the auspices of the US-Ireland Alliance, a non-profit non-partisan organization based in Arlington, VA. The program began in 1998, created by US-Ireland Alliance president Trina Vargo with early support from the Irish and British Governments. Over the last decade, the program has been largely funded by the United States Department of State, with additional support from the Northern Ireland Government, Becton Dickinson, and Cross Atlantic Capital Partners. In 2010, the Irish Parliament passed legislation whereby it will match any contributions, up to 20 million euros, to an endowment for the Scholarship program. A Mitchell Scholarship award includes tuition, housing, airfare, a cash stipend, and other benefits such as a travel bursary to encourage travel both in and outside Ireland and Northern Ireland.  In recent years, Mitchell Scholars have used their travel bursary to explore countries as diverse as Oman, Cambodia, Senegal and Azerbaijan.

Scholarship purpose
The Mitchell Scholars Program, named to honor former U.S. Senator George J. Mitchell's pivotal contribution to the Northern Ireland peace process, is designed to introduce and connect future American leaders to the island of Ireland and recognize and foster intellectual achievement, leadership, and a commitment to community and public service.

Alumni 
Alumni of the Mitchell Scholarship program have pursued careers in consulting, law, academia, politics, and journalism. Notable alumni include Arsalan Suleman, the acting U.S. Special Envoy to the Organization of Islamic Cooperation; Matt Haney, president of the San Francisco Board of Education; Ty McCormick, the Africa editor of Foreign Policy magazine; Jimmy Soni, the former managing editor of the Huffington Post; and Dr. Thomas J Vitolo, American energy consultant and Massachusetts from the 15th Norfolk District.

Placement
Mitchell Scholars are placed at universities in both the Republic of Ireland and Northern Ireland, including Trinity College, Dublin, University College Cork, University of Limerick, National University of Ireland, Galway, National University of Ireland, Maynooth, University College Dublin, Dublin City University, University of Ulster and Queen's University Belfast.

Controversy
In 2012, the Department of State attempted to eliminate funding for the program but with the support of several members of the United States Congress, university presidents and professors, the public in the form of a petition, and the Irish and Northern Ireland Governments, the decision was reversed for fiscal year 2013.

See also 
 Churchill Scholarship
 Fulbright Scholarship
 Gates Cambridge Scholarship
 Harkness Fellowship
 Harry S. Truman Scholarship
 Marshall Scholarship
 Rhodes Scholarship
 Jardine Scholarship

References

External links
Official website

Awards established in 2001
Scholarships in the United States